The March 707 was a British Group 7 sports prototype racing car, built by March Engineering in 1970 for the Can-Am series. It was driven by New Zealand racing driver, Chris Amon.

References

Sports prototypes
Can-Am cars
March vehicles